Milton S. Buchli (August 18, 1910 – May 5, 2003) was a politician in the state of Wisconsin.

Buchli was born to Sam and Agnes Buchli in Montana, Wisconsin. He married Erna Riesch on June 4, 1941. Buchli died at age 93. He was a Methodist.

Career
Buchli served as chairman of the Buffalo County, Wisconsin Democratic Party from 1950 to 1956, and was a member of the Wisconsin Democratic State Central Committee. In 1956 he unsuccessfully ran for a seat in the Wisconsin State Assembly. Eventually he was elected, serving in the Assembly from 1965 to 1966, when he was defeated by Stanley York. Buchli also worked as a school teacher and a farmer, and he served in the United States Army during World War II.

References

See also
The Political Graveyard

People from Buffalo County, Wisconsin
Members of the Wisconsin State Assembly
Military personnel from Wisconsin
United States Army soldiers
United States Army personnel of World War II
Methodists from Wisconsin
21st-century Methodists
Schoolteachers from Wisconsin
Farmers from Wisconsin
1910 births
2003 deaths
20th-century American politicians
20th-century American educators